The name Stig Engström may refer to:

 Stig Engström (actor), born 14 January 1942
 Stig Engström (suspected murderer), 1934–2000, also known as The Skandia man